Paderne is a Portuguese parish, located in the municipality of Melgaço. The population in 2011 was 1,160, in an area of 12.85 km2.

References

Freguesias of Melgaço, Portugal